Rhodaphodius foetens is a species of scarab beetles native to Europe.

This species was formerly a member of the genus Aphodius.

References

Scarabaeidae
Beetles described in 1787
Beetles of Europe